"Liebt sie dich so wie ich?" is a song by Austrian recording artist Christina Stürmer. It was written by Kurt Keinrath and Peter Wessely for her second studio album, Soll das wirklich alles sein? (2004), while production was led by Alexander Kahr. The song was released as the album's fourth and final single in Austria and reached number seven on the Ö3 Austria Top 40.

Formats and track listings

Charts

References

External links
 

2005 singles
Christina Stürmer songs
2004 songs